Bannang Sata may refer to
Bannang Sata (town), Yala province, Thailand
Bannang Sata District, or one of its subdistricts, in Yala province, Thailand